West Achaea ( – Dytiki Achaia) is a municipal subdivision within greater Achaea – an ancient region of West Greece which forms part of the modern territory of larger Greece. The seat of the municipality is the town Kato Achaia. The municipality has an area of 573.30 km2.

Municipality
The municipality West Achaea was formed at the 2011 local government reform by the merger of the following 4 former municipalities, that became municipal units:
Dymi
Larissos
Movri
Olenia

References

External links

Municipalities of Western Greece
Populated places in Achaea